Ali Ashourizad Hayvan (born August 1, 1980) is an Iranian retired football player.

 Assist goals

References
 Iran Pro League Stats

External links 

1980 births
Living people
Iranian footballers
Pegah Gilan players
Saipa F.C. players
Damash Gilan players
Steel Azin F.C. players
Association football defenders
People from Rasht
Sportspeople from Gilan province